Shangyuanmen station is a station of Line 3 on the Nanjing Metro. Most of the line entered operation on 1 April 2015. However, due to delays in construction work clearing land in the station's vicinity, Shangyuanmen station itself opened on 18 October 2015.

References

Railway stations in China opened in 2015
Nanjing Metro stations